Kanka is a given name and surname. Notable people with the name include:

Edvin Kanka Ćudić (born 1988), Bosnian human rights activist
František Maxmilián Kaňka (1674–1766), Czech architect and builder
Megan Kanka (1986–1994), child murder victim in New Jersey, United States

See also
Canka, surname